Taylor Steele was born on 7 June 1972. Steele has been involved in the surf film industry for over two decades. He has won awards as both director and producer. His production company, Poor Specimen, has launched the careers of some of surfing’s most influential figures and has played a role in the success of bands such as Blink-182, Pennywise, and Jack Johnson, who were introduced in Steele's early movies.

Early career 
In 1992, Steele released a 35-minute VHS film entitled Momentum. The film showcases a blend of punk rock music and surfing.

In his early career Steele collaborated with figures such as Kelly Slater, Shane Dorian, Big Todd Levy and Rob Machado, as well as musicians including Blink-182, Pennywise  and The Offspring. In an interview with Tracks Magazine, Blink-182 vocalist Tom DeLonge  recalls Steele's contribution to their early success: "[Taylor] was putting our band along with the biggest surfer's in the world and back then Action Sports wasn't really called action sports but that lifestyle was very connected to punk rock music so we had our first really big chance to win over any kind of fans within the surfing and skate boarding community".

Steele's collaboration with the musicians featured in his early films initiated the GoodTimes Tour. The GoodTimes Tour was a concert tour by American rock band in support of GoodTimes, a surf video directed by Taylor Steele. The tour featured bands from the video's soundtrack, including Pennywise, Blink-182, Pivit, Unwritten Law, 7 Seconds and Sprung Monkey. Blink-182 drummer Scott Raynor commented on the tour in 2010: "Honestly, the shows went well. We always got a good reaction, and the next time we came around we had more fans and better floors to sleep on".

Steele's 1999 surf film Loose Change featuring Rob Machado won the Australian Surfing Life Reader's Choice Award.

In 2009, Steele and Rob Machado collaborated to create the film The Drifter. The film won Best Picture at the California Surf Film Festival and the Ombak Bali Festival. The Drifter was also screened at the X-Dance Film Festival in Aspen, Colorado in January.

Later works 
After a series of early films including GoodTimes, Loose Change, Arc, Focus and several others, Taylor's filmmaking shifted focus.

In 2006, Steele made Sipping Jetstreams. The film is a combination of travel and surf. Taylor Steele and photographer Dustin Humphrie's objective was a light, but beautiful, travelogue. Sipping Jetstreams won best cinematography at the X-Dance Film Festival.
Sipping Jetstreams the oversize hard-back coffee-table book and the DVD were released in October 2006.
In 2010, Steele released Castles in the Sky. Castles In The Sky stars Jordy Smith, Dane Reynolds, Rob Machado, Dave Rastovich, Kalani Rob, Dan Malloy, Craig Anderson and others, surfing in the various remote countries around the globe. Each location is characterized by unique landscapes.
The soundtrack for Castles in the Sky was recorded on location with musician/surfers; Timmy Curran, Ozzie Wright, and Kelly Slater; in many cases the soundtrack included music from local cultures.
Steele has received recognition for his works within the film industry. In 2002, he won the X-Dance award for Best Film, Best Cinematography, and Best Editing for the movie Shelter.  That same year acting as executive producer, the film Hallowed Ground was named ESPN’s Action Sports Movie of the Year.  In addition Castles in the Sky won Audience Choice award for most Visionary Documentary, the film also picked up the Beacon Award at the Maui Film Festival. Further more, Castles in the Sky was showcased at National Geographic headquarters in 2010. Recently Steele was voted one of Surfer Magazine’s "25 Most Powerful People" and one of Wave Magazine’s "Top Ten Most Important People in Surfing".

Current works 
Steele’s work now includes international brands, music production and art collaborations. Some of which have featured at the Gagosian Gallery NY and the Venice Biennale. Currently underway is the development of Steele's first feature film.

In 2012, Steele worked with artist Richard Phillips to co-direct the short film First Point, starring Lindsay Lohan. Thomas Bangalter from Daft Punk did the score and Jay Rabinowitz who worked on Requiem for a Dream and The Tree of Life, edited the short film.

In 2013 Steele produced the Byron Bay band MT WARNING. Their new single Youth Bird was previewed on Dom Alessio from National Broadcaster Triple J’s blog on 7 August 2013, where Dom noted "Following on from the beautiful slow-burner  Forward Miles, MT WARNING are back with the propulsive and rocking Youth Bird. It features sharp guitar chords, a driving drum rhythm and Mikey Bee's howling vocals."

Steele for two years (2013-2014) worked as the Creative Director of Corona for Australia with a focus on commercial directing.

Steele's most recent film, PROXIMITY, a visceral portrait of modern surfing. The film follows eight of the world's best surfers - four legends and four rising stars - as they search for new waves and deeper understanding in exotic destinations. Starring Kelly Slater, Rob Machado, Shane Dorian, Dave Rastovich, John John Florence, Craig Anderson, Steph Gilmore and Albee Layer.

In 2014 Steele was named Fast Company (magazine) 100 Most Creative in Business

Taylor Steele currently lives in New York and directs films, Virtual Reality movies and commercials.

Filmography 
 1991: One Step Beyond - Limited Release
 1992: Momentum
 1993: Momentum 2
 1994: Focus
 1994: Factory Seconds
 1995: Good Times
 1996: Drifting
 1997: The Show - Best Video Surfer Poll Awards
 1998: All For One
 1999: Loose Change - Best Film 2000 Readers Choice Award ASL magazine
 2000: Hit and Run
 2001: Momentum (2001 film) and Hallowed Ground ( Producer) - ESPN Action Sports Movie Of The Year Award
 2002: Arc
 2002: Drive Thru Series (Producer)
 2003: Campaign
 2005: Campaign 2
 2006: Sipping Jetstreams - Best Cinematography X-Dance Film Festival
 2007: Stranger Than Fiction
 2007: Trilogy
 2007: Shelter (Co-directed with Chris Malloy) - Best Director, Film & Editing X-Dance Film Festival
 2008: Days of Strange (Producer)
 2009: The Drifter - Best Director X-Dance Film Festival
 2010: Modern Collective, Producer - Best Video Surfer Poll Awards
 2010: Castles In The Sky - Most Visionary Documentary Maui Film Festival - Best Cinematography Surfer Poll Awards
 2011: Innersection (Producer)
 2012: Here & Now (Producer)
 2012: This Time Tomorrow - Best Film London Surf Film Festival
 2013: Missing - Movie of the Year The Australian Surfing Awards and Best Film Florida Surf Festival
 2017: Proximity (Director) - in partnership with Teton Gravity Research and Garage Films
 2018: Momentum Generation

References

External links 
 http://www.taylorsteele.tv

1982 births
Living people
Film producers from California